Franklin Manor-on-the-Bay is an unincorporated community or populated place (Class Code U6) located in Anne Arundel County, Maryland, United States at latitude 38.802 and longitude -76.515, at an elevation of 3 feet. Franklin Manor-on-the-Bay appears on the Deale U.S. Geological Survey Map. Anne Arundel County is in the Eastern time zone (UTC−5).

References 

Unincorporated communities in Anne Arundel County, Maryland
Unincorporated communities in Maryland
Maryland populated places on the Chesapeake Bay